Swimming at the 2000 Summer Paralympics comprised a total of 169 events, 91 for men and 78 for women. Swimmers were classified according to the extent and type of their disability.

Medal summary

Medal table

Participating nations

Events

Men's events

Women's events

References 

 

2000 Summer Paralympics events
2000
Paralympics
Swimming competitions in Australia